The 1984 Ball State Cardinals football team was an American football team that represented Ball State University in the Mid-American Conference (MAC) during the 1984 NCAA Division I-A football season. In its seventh and final season under head coach Dwight Wallace, the team compiled a 3–8 record (3–5 against MAC opponents) and tied for sixth place out of ten teams in the conference. The team played its home games at Ball State Stadium in Muncie, Indiana.

The team's statistical leaders included Neil Britt with 1,205 passing yards, Burt Austin with 551 rushing yards, Ricky George with 503 receiving yards, and Jay Neal and John Diettrich with 36 points scored.

Schedule

References

Ball State
Ball State Cardinals football seasons
Ball State Cardinals football